Sir John Borlase, 2nd Baronet (1640 – 1 February 1689) was an English politician.

Born in Bockmer End in Buckinghamshire, he was the son of Sir John Borlase, 1st Baronet and Alice Bankes, daughter of Sir John Bankes, Lord Chief Justice of the Court of Common Pleas and Mary Hawtrey. His nephew was Borlase Warren.

John Borlase was educated at Oriel College, Oxford, where he matriculated in 1658. In 1672, he succeeded his father as the 2nd baronet. A year later, he entered the English House of Commons as member of parliament (MP) for Wycombe, representing the constituency until 1681. From 1685 until his death in 1689, he was also returned for Great Marlow.

Borlase died unmarried and was buried in Stratton Audley in Oxfordshire. With his death the baronetcy became extinct. His estate passed eventually to his nephew Borlase Warren, who sat as MP for Nottingham in four Parliaments between 1713 and 1747.

References

1642 births
1689 deaths
People from Buckinghamshire
Alumni of Oriel College, Oxford
Baronets in the Baronetage of England
People from Oxfordshire
English MPs 1661–1679
English MPs 1679
English MPs 1680–1681
English MPs 1681
English MPs 1685–1687
English MPs 1689–1690